Sthenarus is a genus of true bugs belonging to the family Miridae.

The species of this genus are found in Europe.

Species
Species:

Sthenarus albipilis 
Sthenarus australis 
Sthenarus pubescens 
Sthenarus rotermundi

References

Miridae